Heaven Is Ours (Greek: Oi ouranoi einai dikoi mas) is a 1953 Greek drama film directed by Dinos Dimopoulos and starring Antigoni Valakou, Aleka Katselli and Alekos Alexandrakis.

Cast
 Antigoni Valakou as Spourgitaki  
 Aleka Katselli as Gianna Varlamou  
 Alekos Alexandrakis as Tonis Varentis  
 Labros Konstadaras as Thanos Varlamos 
 Niki Alatsatianou as Spourgitaki  
 Sofia Arseni 
 Giorgos Gioldasis 
 Nikos Kazis 
 Errikos Kontarinis 
 Athanasia Moustaka as Grandmother  
 Despina Panayotidou 
 Kostas Papahristos 
 Ioulietta Sotiraki as Lena Vouraki  
 Koulis Stoligas as Customer  
 Kostas Strantzalis 
 Thanasis Tzeneralis as Commander  
 Giorgos Tzifos
 Giorgos Vlahopoulos 
 Nikos Fermas as Snitch

References

Bibliography
 Achilleas Hadjikyriacou. Masculinity and Gender in Greek Cinema: 1949-1967. Bloomsbury Publishing, 2013.

External links
 

1953 films
1953 drama films
1950s Greek-language films
Greek drama films
Films directed by Dinos Dimopoulos
Greek black-and-white films